The Mummy (also known as The Mummy: The Animated Series) is an American animated series produced by Universal Cartoon Studios based on the 1999 film of the same name. It premiered on Kids' WB on The WB network on September 22, 2001. It is set in 1938. It was retooled and renamed The Mummy: Secrets of the Medjai for its second and final season, which began on February 8, 2003. The show was cancelled on June 7, 2003. Reruns of the show still aired on Kids' WB until it was removed from its Saturday morning lineup around July 2003.

Storyline
Based loosely on the movies The Mummy and The Mummy Returns, the O'Connells find themselves being chased around the world by the undead corrupt High Priest, Imhotep, and his lackey, Colin Weasler, while trying to get the Manacle of Osiris off Alex's wrist. This takes their trip across the world, trying to locate the lost scrolls of Thebes, the only things that can remove the manacle. The scrolls had to be destroyed to prevent Imhotep from possessing the manacle. In the second season, Alex is trained as a Medjai to combat the mummy, as well as facing new threats along the way.

Characters

Main characters
 Alex O'Connell  (voiced by Chris Marquette) - A 12-year-old (later 14-year-old) boy with a fantastic imagination and boundless curiosity. Alex possesses the best, and sometimes the worst traits of both parents. Homeschooled by Evy, he knows ancient histories and languages incredibly well for his age. Alex also inherited his father's brashness, sense of humor and adventurous spirit, traits which frequently get him into hot water. As the series progresses, Alex slowly learns how to control a few of the Manacle's powers. But with these low level powers comes an awesome responsibility, one that Alex does not take lightly despite his tender years.
 Rick O'Connell (voiced by John Schneider) - Alex's tough father and Evy's husband.
 Evy O’Connell Carnahan (voiced by Grey DeLisle) - Alex's mother and Rick's wife. Just like the movie, Evy is the reincarnation of the Egyptian princess Nefertiri.
 Jonathan Carnahan (voiced by Tom Kenny) - Alex's uncle, Evy's bumbling but good natured older brother and Rick's brother-in-law.

Allies
 Ardeth Bay (voiced by Nicholas Guest) - Leader of the Medjai. In the second season, he and the other Medjai train Alex, Fadil, Yanit, and other students to be the next generation of Medjai.
 Fadil (voiced by Jeff Bennett) - A boy who is a student at becoming a Medjai.
 Tut - A mongoose from India and Alex's pet. Rick is allergic to Tut, but allows Alex to keep him regardless.
 Yanit (voiced by Jeannie Elias) - A girl who is a student at becoming a Medjai.
 The Minotaur (voiced by Kevin Michael Richardson) - A Medjai who chose to become a minotaur to protect the Scrolls of Thebes from the First French Empire under Napoleon Bonaparte. He dwelled beneath Paris' catacombs, until he encountered the O'Connells. The Minotaur was thought to be buried by rubble, only to resurface in the series finale, where he helped the O'Connells stop Imhotep from raising the Army of Anubis.
 Jack O'Connell (voiced by Charles Napier) - Rick's father, whom he is estranged from until "Like Father, Like Son". He is revealed to be a Medjai, meaning that both Rick and Alex have Medjai blood.
 Jin-Wu (voiced by Mona Marshall) - A young boy who happens to be the Emperor of China. He steals an ancient shrine and throws the O'Connells in jail when they threaten to reveal this. When the theft incites an ancient Chinese dragon to attack Jin-Wu's city, he admits his wrongdoing and helps Alex undo the curse. This is related to Han, also the Emperor of China in The Mummy: Tomb of the Dragon Emperor.

Villains
 Imhotep (voiced by Jim Cummings) - The titular character of the series. Many years ago, Imhotep was a priest who wanted to rule the world. He was already the keeper of the Scrolls of Thebes. When he was about to steal the Manacle of Osiris, the Pharaoh sent his royal guards to capture him and sentence him to be mummified alive. Years later, Imhotep was resurrected by Colin Weasler (see below), despite Evy's attempt to destroy him. He plots to seek the Scroll of Thebes in order to remove the Manacle of Osiris from Alex. When it comes to the fight in the Paris Catacombs where the Scrolls of Thebes are, he does regain them before they end up destroyed by Alex using the Manacle's power to bring a torch underneath the Scroll of Thebes. Though he was thought dead when fighting the Minotaur within flooding catacombs, Imhotep managed to survive and strove to find other ways to conquer the world. Unlike the movies, he is able to speak contemporary English in this series.
 Anck-Su-Namun (voiced by Lenore Zann) - The former lover of Imhotep, who was mummified for betraying the Pharaoh and murdering Princess Nefertiri. She was revived by Imhotep by throwing her body into the Lake of Eternity. He needed her to locate the Scythe of Anubis, which she and Nefertiri hid away long ago. But when they acquired the scythe, Anck-Su-Namun betrayed Imhotep, refusing to be subordinate to him. However, Nefertiri, who had resurfaced in Evy's body, called on Anubis to reclaim what's his. Anck-Su-Namun, refusing to let go of her prize, went down into the Underworld with Anubis. However, Ardeth believed that they have not seen the last of her. Anck-Su-Namun resurfaced in "Old Friends" and took a magic ring, enabling her to steal the youth from others to regenerate herself before going after the Manacle. The O'Connells are able to stop her and managed to send her back to the Underworld.
 Colin Weasler (voiced by Michael Reisz) - Imhotep's Renfield-like servant and Evy's co-worker/rival from the museum. In his 20s, Weasler is younger than Evy. Driven by blind ambition, Weasler is a liar and a backstabber and jealous of Evy's archaeological fame. Craving power and respect, fame over fortune, it is Weasler who summons up Imhotep in the name of revenge on Evy. But once the Mummy is summoned, Weasler quickly realizes he has gotten way more than he bargained for. He has two options, either serve Imhotep or be his first victim. Weasler wisely chooses the former. Throughout the series, Weasler is the guy who talks tough while he's standing behind Imhotep. As time goes on, Weasler becomes more greedy, believing that if he devotes himself to Imhotep, the Mummy will reward him once he takes over the world. During Imhotep's apparent demise following his fight with the Minotaur in the Catacombs of Paris, Colin was shown writing comics and claiming to be Imhotep's master when Imhotep returns. Although Weasler is your typical, annoying, egotistical, self-righteous, cowardly "yes" man to Imhotep, occasionally he's a physical threat to the O'Connells. He has also been considered by many fans to be the animated version of Beni Gabor from The Mummy.
 Ninzam Toth (voiced by Michael T. Weiss) - A Dark Medjai who betrayed the other Medjai, fought with Ardeth Bay as a villain and lost, and was imprisoned for his actions. After escaping, he plots revenge on every Medjai. He was defeated by Alex, Yanit, and Fadil, but returns to continue his vengeance on the Medjai.
 Scarab (voiced by René Auberjonois) - A monstrous scarab-like creature that was sealed away in the Scarab Amulet by the powers of the Manacle of Osiris. Alex and his grandfather Jack accidentally freed him while trying to obtain the Amulet.
 The Rakshasa/Tiger-Man (voiced by John DiMaggio) - A human-tiger beast from the Temple of Shiva in Sri Lanka that has a shape-shifting ability. The beast was captured by Jonathan's old friend Charlie Royce as an attraction at an amusement park in Chicago. Later, he shape-shifts into the form of Royce to trick Jonathan into believing that the beast had escaped and locked Royce in the cage in order to get free and then attempts to get the Eye of Shiva but gets into a fight with Imhotep as he also wants the Eye.
 Aglaophones (voiced by April Winchell and Kathy Najimy) - Two female bird-like creatures whose songs can enslave any man to do their bidding. They tried to steal the Cloak of Isis, which increases the wearer's power tenfold, but were imprisoned in a wall carving by the gods with the Flute of Nepthys. Colin Weasler used the Flute to free them, wrongly believing they would serve him. They have aspects from both the Sirens and Harpies of Greek mythology.

Episodes

Series overview

Season 1: 2001–2002

Season 2: 2003

Reception
The series received positive reviews from critics with praise given to the writing, animation, and the character of Alex O'Connell. In February 2003, Kids' WB considered The Mummy, which was airing its second season at the time, one of the network's, "breakout hits."

Merchandise

Video games

On February 20, 2002, it was announced video game developer Ubisoft had obtained the rights to The Mummy: The Animated Series from Universal Studios Consumer Products Group, enabling the publisher to produce games based on the brand. It was projected the Gameboy Advance game would be completed in the fall of 2002.

HIP Interactive had developed a new game based on The Mummy: The Animated Series for PlayStation 2, Xbox, and PC. In May 2004, they revealed they would be showing off their new game at E3 later that year. On June 30, 2004, All In The Game LTD, who was co-producing the new game with HIP Interactive, revealed Corey Johnson would reprise his role as "Mr. Daniels" from the 1999 film The Mummy, in the new video game. According to casting director Phil Morris, Johnson was brought in to help reproduce the same production values of the original films and television show.

Home media release
In October 2002, Universal released The Mummy: Quest of the Lost Scrolls on VHS and DVD. Dubbed a "feature length adventure", the film was a mash up of the first episode of the series, and the last two episode from season one.

Universal Studios Home Entertainment released the entire series on DVD in Region 1 in three-volume sets in 2008. They were released in Canada on July 22 and in the U.S. on December 16.

See also
 The Mummy
 The Mummy Returns
 The Mummy: Tomb of the Dragon Emperor

References

External links
 

Kids' WB original shows
Disney Channel original programming
2000s American animated television series
2001 American television series debuts
2003 American television series endings
Ancient Egypt in fiction
Animated television shows based on films
Cultural depictions of Nefertari
Television series by Universal Animation Studios
Television series set in the 1930s
Television shows set in ancient Egypt
Toon Disney original programming
Television shows set in Egypt
Television shows set in Africa
American children's animated action television series
American children's animated adventure television series
American children's animated fantasy television series
American children's animated horror television series
American children's animated mystery television series
American children's animated supernatural television series
English-language television shows
Jetix original programming
Television series about mummies
Television series based on Egyptian mythology